The Lost & Wandering Blues and Jazz Band was a group of street musicians playing a variety of musical styles on washtub bass, trumpet, and guitar.  The band consisted of Danny Fitzgerald, Eugene Semyon Clarke, David Alexander Shore, Madeleine Peyroux, and Frank Schaap.

Band members
Danny Fitzgerald (musician) was the band leader.  He was born June 10 1933, in Kingston, New York, USA.
Eugene Semyon Clark was born November 2, 1965 in Chapel Hill, North Carolina, USA.
David Alexander Shore was born August 3, 1979 in Stockholm, Sweden.
Madeleine Peyroux was the vocalist and was born in 1974 in Athens, Georgia, USA.
Frank Schaap was born May 5, 1952 in New York City, New York, USA, and raised from an early age in Kentucky, USA.

Discography
Spreading Rhythm Around
Best Of

References

External links
The Lost Wandering Blues and Jazz Band — Official site
 Facebook page
Via Paris, with Snaps TIME article

Lost